Ann-Gael de Saint is a Paralympian athlete from Belgium competing mainly in category C7 throwing events.

Ann competed in all the throws for the C7 class in both the 1988 and 1992 Summer Paralympics, winning silver in shot and discus in both games and winning a bronze on the javelin in 1992.

External links
 profile on paralympic.org

Paralympic athletes of Belgium
Athletes (track and field) at the 1988 Summer Paralympics
Athletes (track and field) at the 1992 Summer Paralympics
Paralympic silver medalists for Belgium
Paralympic bronze medalists for Belgium
Living people
Medalists at the 1988 Summer Paralympics
Medalists at the 1992 Summer Paralympics
Year of birth missing (living people)
Paralympic medalists in athletics (track and field)
Belgian female shot putters
Belgian female discus throwers
Belgian female javelin throwers